Nathan Joynes (born 7 August 1985) is an English footballer who plays as a forward for Handsworth Parramore F.C.

Career
Joynes came through the youth ranks with his hometown side Barnsley. His first team debut came on 23 April 2005 against Port Vale while still a trainee, Joynes replacing Simon Johnson as a second-half substitute in 5–0 away defeat for Barnsley. Joynes was given his first professional contract in September 2005.

Joynes joined FC Halifax Town on loan in November 2006, scoring three times in the Conference National before being recalled by Barnsley in January 2007. Later that month he joined Boston United on loan, and was a regular in their struggling side until returning to Barnsley with four games remaining and Boston deep in both financial trouble and a relegation battle. In July 2007 Joynes joined recently relegated League Two side Bradford City on loan until 1 January 2008. He played two league games before he returned to Barnsley. Two days after his return to Barnsley, Joynes and his teammate Thomas Harban, who was also on loan at Bradford, joined FC Halifax Town on a free transfer.

He moved to Stalybridge Celtic for the 2008–09 season before moving back to FC Halifax Town in March 2009 for his third spell with the club.

In August 2009 a move to Guiseley followed, before in November 2009 he signed with Matlock Town.

In October 2012 he joined Stocksbridge Park Steels.

In 2015, he joined Handsworth Parramore F.C.

References

External links

1985 births
Living people
English footballers
Barnsley F.C. players
Halifax Town A.F.C. players
Boston United F.C. players
Bradford City A.F.C. players
FC Halifax Town players
Stalybridge Celtic F.C. players
Guiseley A.F.C. players
Matlock Town F.C. players
Stocksbridge Park Steels F.C. players
Handsworth F.C. players
English Football League players
National League (English football) players
Footballers from Barnsley
Association football forwards